Scribblenauts Showdown is a party game developed by Shiver Entertainment and published by Warner Bros. Interactive Entertainment for the Nintendo Switch, PlayStation 4, and Xbox One in March 2018. The game is the sixth installment in the Scribblenauts franchise, created by 5th Cell. Showdown sees players playing minigames against other players or CPUs.

Showdown received "mixed or average" reviews from critics. Critics criticized the game's "lack of imagination" but praised the game's sandbox mode for being more alike prior Scribblenauts games.

Gameplay 

Scribblenauts Showdown's main mode, Showdown, has players competing against opponents in different minigames. Prior to starting a minigame, players must select a noun that they will use to try to win the game. Before selecting a word, the game spins a wheel, which will decide what letter the player's words will start with. In Showdown mode, players play on different boards, akin to Nintendo's Mario Party series. The game also has a versus mode, which is similar to Showdown, except it's a 1v1 and doesn't take place on a board.

The game's sandbox mode is more like prior Scribblenauts installments and sees the player trying to solve NPC's issues by creating objects using a magical notebook. After solving an issue, players are rewarded with "Starites", which can be used to buy apparel in the customization menu. The sandbox mode has 8 different worlds and supports up to 2 players.

The game supports up to 4 players. Players can also verse CPUs. Players can customize their characters in the "My Scribblenaut" menu. Players can unlock customization options for their avatars by spending Starites, which are unlocked after winning in the versus or Showdown mode, or by clearing missions in the sandbox mode.

Development and release 
Prior to its official announcement, Showdown was leaked by the Game Software Rating Regulations and Entertainment Software Rating Board, after the two boards publicly released the game's ratings. Scribblenauts Showdown was officially announced by Warner Bros. Interactive Entertainment in January 2018. Development for Showdown was headed by Shiver Entertainment, making it the first in the series not to be developed by the original creators, 5th Cell.

Showdown released on March 6, 2018, in North America for the Nintendo Switch, PlayStation 4, and Xbox One. The game was later released in Europe and Australia on March 9.

Reception 

On Nintendo Switch, Scribblenauts Showdown received "generally unfavorable reviews" from critics, according to review aggregator Metacritic, although it received "mixed or average critic reviews" on PlayStation 4 and Xbox One. Critics criticized the game's "lack of imagination", with Edge thinking that Shiver Entertainment couldn't "conjure up a decent party game", despite the game's "great source material".

Marco Esposto of IGN Italy praised Showdown, calling it a "classic" party game. Esposto praised the game's avatar creation process for being "simple" and the game's "attractive" graphics, but criticized the low amount of minigames, citing that they quickly felt "repetitive". Ultimately, Esposto gave Showdown a score of 7.3/10.

The game's minigames received mixed reception among critics; Robert Handlery of GameSpot called them "boring", Gav Murphy of IGN Nordic stated that some of them are "awesome", and Stephen Tailby of Push Square called them "hit or miss".

The sandbox mode was praised by critics for being more alike prior Scribblenauts installments. Daan Koopman, reviewing Showdown for Nintendo World Report, wrote that the mode is "sadly the biggest standout" in the game. Koopman praised the mode's animations and interactions for being "adorable" but criticized its controls for being "uncomfortable" and its missions for being "bland".

Notes

References

External links 
 

2018 video games
Showdown
Warner Bros. video games
Party video games
Nintendo Switch games
PlayStation 4 games
Xbox One games
Video game sequels
Video games developed in the United States
Video games with user-generated gameplay content